Defectors is a Challenge TV game show that aired from 2001 to 2002, hosted by Richard Orford. The format was that the audience would vote on which contestant they thought would get a question right, and the percentage of votes would determine possible scores for subsequent questions. Both the winning contestant and the audience member who made the most correct guesses would win prizes.

Challenge TV occasionally repeat the series in early hours slots, however, as episodes 1–12 of the first series are longer than other episodes, they are too long to fit into their schedule and as such no longer are repeated.

Separate from the game in the show itself but as part of an episode's broadcast, viewers at home could push the red button on their Sky television remote control during episodes to access an interactive section where they could win prizes.

UKGameshows.com were generally favourable for the series, saying that compared to Challenge TV's attempts at game shows when it was known as The Family Channel, Defectors is a "qualified success for the new grown-up Challenge TV". They added Defectors has "got an original format, an excellent host, good if not perfect production values and quite an entertaining 40 minutes all said and done."

Transmissions

References

External links

2001 British television series debuts
2002 British television series endings
2000s British game shows
Interactive television
English-language television shows